Antti Herlin (born 14 November 1956) is a Finnish billionaire businessman, and the chairman of the Finnish KONE Corporation. He is the son of Pekka Herlin, former chairman of KONE. He is the former chairman of the Confederation of Finnish Industries (Elinkeinoelämän Keskusliitto EK).

Herlin owns a farm in Kirkkonummi where he raises Hereford and Aberdeen Angus beef cattle. Herlin is the richest person in Finland – as of May 2021 Forbes reported his net worth as $7.0 billion, naming him the 404th richest person in the world.

Positions
In addition to his duties at KONE, Herlin holds the following positions:

 Chairman of Sanoma Oyj since 2013

Publicity
It was investigated if Herlin used inside information in his Kone and Partek stock investments in 2001-2002. The investigation found Herlin innocent. Herlin started his own investigation into who is responsible for the case becoming public in the media in 2005. The authorities accused by him could not be proved to have given any information.

Investments 
In 2005 the Herlin family made significant investments in the construction companies YIT and Lemminkäinen.

Agriculture 
Herlin received agricultural support from the state of €275,792 in 2012. State total support was €2.1 billion.

References 

1956 births
Living people
Finnish businesspeople
Finnish billionaires
Antti
Recipients of the Order of the White Star, 3rd Class
Finnish industrialists